Stein Kollshaugen (born 16 February 1956) is a Norwegian football player. He was born in Gjøvik. He played for the club Moss FK, and also for the Norwegian national team. He competed at the 1984 Summer Olympics in Los Angeles.

References

External links

1956 births
Living people
Sportspeople from Gjøvik
Norwegian footballers
Norway international footballers
Footballers at the 1984 Summer Olympics
Olympic footballers of Norway
Association football forwards